Nishat Muhammad Zia Qadri is a Pakistani politician who had been a Member of the Provincial Assembly of Sindh, from May 2013 to May 2018.

Early life and education
He was born on 2 April 1966 in Karachi.

He has a degree of Bachelor of Commerce from Karachi University.

Political career

He was elected to the Provincial Assembly of Sindh as a candidate of Mutahida Quami Movement from Constituency PS-120 KARACHI-XXXII in 2013 Pakistani general election.

References

Living people
Sindh MPAs 2013–2018
1966 births
Muttahida Qaumi Movement politicians